Oshimili South Local Government Area is one of the twenty-five Local Government Areas making up Delta State. It is situated in the Niger Delta Region/the South-South geo-political zone of Nigeria. It was part of the Asaba Division of the Southern Protectorate in Colonial Nigeria and later a part of the Western Region following the delineation of the country into Three Regions through the Richard's Constitution of 1946. It later became part of the Mid-Western Region in 1963, and Mid-Western State in 1967. It became part of Bendel State and was carved out of the old Asaba Division in 1976 as part of Oshimili Local Government. It became Oshimili South Local Government in 1996 after the creation of Delta State from the defunct Bendel State in 1991.

Cities, Towns and Communities
 Asaba
 Okwe
 Oko

References

Local Government Areas in Delta State
Asaba